Avery Berkel is a brand and major manufacturer of commercial weighing machines owned by Illinois Tool Works.

Avery Berkel initially started in 1993 when the British conglomerate General Electric Company combined their GEC Avery (formerly W & T Avery) business with the newly acquired Berkel company. The group continued as a subsidiary of GEC (and later Marconi plc) until March 2000 when it was sold to Weigh-Tronix for £102.5 million to create Avery Weigh-Tronix. Avery Berkel continued as the commercial brand of Avery Weigh-Tronix.

In September 2007, Illinois Tool Works acquired Avery Berkel from Avery Weigh-Tronix. Illinois Tool Works acquired Avery Weigh-Tronix one year later, but kept the two companies separate.

References

External links

Manufacturing companies of the United Kingdom